Barwaaqo is a town in the southwestern Gedo region of Somalia.

References
Barwaaqo

Populated places in Gedo